Greg Brooker is a British music producer.

He has worked with indie, metal, rock, punk and electronica artists including: DeStijl featuring Peter Hook from Joy Division / New Order & Julie Gordon from Happy Mondays, You Love Her Coz She's Dead, Call The Doctor, Newton Faulkner, Akyra, Showing Off To Thieves, Space Fight, Sharp End First, Run From Robots, Electronic Deer, Soundisciples, Tiny Elvis, The Hurt Process.

Greg Brooker has worked on songs that have been featured on E4 tv's Skins (UK TV series) and EA Games Burnout Paradise, and has worked on releases that have charted in various countries. 

Swindelli album 'Wait' entered iTunes Top 200 Releases United Kingdom Dance Chart. 

Electronic Deer entered Deezer Top 300 Releases Turkey All Genres Chart. 

ShutUp! It's Sunday entered iTunes Top 200 Tracks South Africa Alternative Chart. 

You Love Her Cos She's Dead entered Deezer Top 300 Releases Bulgaria All Genres Chart. 

Inn~Spire entered iTunes Top 200 Releases United Kingdom Alternative Chart. 

In 2002 Greg Brooker formed Glasstone Productions Ltd, a music production company based in Bath, UK.

Greg Brooker is the founder of independent record label Glasstone Records.

References

1981 births
British record producers
Living people